Winding Hills Park is located off NY 17K in the Comfort Hills  west of the village of Montgomery, New York, United States, straddling the Montgomery-Crawford town line. It is a  area centered on  Diamond Lake that is primarily used for outdoor recreation.

Much of the park is wooded, with some clear areas around the roads. The hills slope up to the east, and the terrain to the north and west remains gently rolling.

The lake is available for paddleboat rental and angling in season, and two smaller ponds on the property are also open to fishermen. There are 51 campsites available for overnight use, between May and October, with payment of an adequate reservation fee. A  trail system is open to hikers and horseback riders, as well as snowshoers and snowmobilers in winter.

A  picnic area with 40 individual picnic sites is available for use.  Each individual picnic site contains a table and charcoal grill.  A picnic shelter for group use is also available.  The rental fee for use of the shelter is $150, for both Orange County and Non-County groups.

References

External links
 Orange County Parks and Recreation: Winding Hills Park

Parks in Orange County, New York